Taytay may refer to:

 Taytay, Palawan, Philippines, a municipality and former kingdom
 Taytay Airport
 Taytay (crater), an impact crater on Mars named after the town
 Taytay, Rizal, Philippines
 Taylor Swift (born 1989), nicknamed TayTay, an American singer-songwriter

See also
 
 Tay 2 (radio station) Tayside, Scotland, UK
 Tay (disambiguation)